The 2002 Berlin Marathon was the 29th running of the annual marathon race held in Berlin, Germany, held on 29 September 2002. Kenya's Raymond Kipkoech won the men's race in 2:06:47 hours, while the women's race was won by Japan's Naoko Takahashi for the second consecutive year, with a time of 2:21:49.

Results

Men

Women

References 

 Results. Association of Road Racing Statisticians. Retrieved 2020-04-02.

External links 
 Official website

2002 in Berlin
Berlin Marathon
Berlin Marathon
Berlin Marathon
Berlin Marathon